The James Bryant Conant Award is a US education award. The most prestigious award made by the Education Commission of the States (ECS), it has been awarded annually since 1977. It was established and named in honour of US chemist and educator James Bryant Conant, one of the co-founders of the ECS.

Recipients
1977 - Benjamin Mays
1978 - Joan Ganz Cooney
1979 - Francis Keppel
1980 - Ralph Tyler
1981 - Terry Sanford
1982 - John Brademas
1983 - Carl D. Perkins
1984 - James B. Hunt Jr.
1985 - Terrel H. Bell and David P. Gardner
1986 - Harold Howe II
1987 - Marian Wright Edelman
1988 - Lamar Alexander
1989 - Fred M. Hechinger
1990 - No award given
1991 - James P. Comer
1992 - Theodore R. Sizer
1993 - Wilhelmina Delco
1994 - Ernest L. Boyer
1995 - Richard W. Riley
1996 - John W. Gardner
1997 - Claiborne Pell
1998 - Robert Slavin
1999 - Frank Newman
2000 - John Goodlad
2001 - Fred Rogers
2002 - Robert P. Moses
2003 - Roy Romer
2004 - Thurgood Marshall and John H. Stelle (both posthumously)
2005 - []]
2006 - Nancy S. Grasmick
2007 - Gaston Caperton
2008 - Ron Wolk
2009 - Kati Haycock
2010 - Linda Darling-Hammond
2011 - Ted Kolderie
2012 - Eric Donald Hirsch
2013 - Gene Wilhoit
2014 - Marc Tucker
2015 - William Sanders
2016 - Sal Kahn
2017 - Lowell Milken
2018 - Bill Haslam

Sources
ECS Award Winners (Education Commission of the States)

American education awards
Awards established in 1977